Strmec pri Leskovcu is a settlement in the Haloze Hills in eastern Slovenia. It is part of the Municipality of Videm. The area traditionally belonged to the Styria region. It is now included in the Drava Statistical Region.

Name
The name of the settlement was changed from Strmec to Strmec pri Leskovcu in 1953.

References

External links
Strmec pri Leskovcu on Geopedia

Populated places in the Municipality of Videm